In Philippine mythology, Ekek (or Ek Ek) are birdlike human creatures. They are winged-humans who search for victims at night. They hunger for flesh and blood. They are usually described as flying creatures that look like the Manananggal, but are unable to divide or split their body in the way that the Manananggal does. The Ekek is also associated with the Wak Wak because of some similar characteristics. The only difference between a Wak Wak and Ekek is that Ekek has a birdlike bill whereas  the Wak Wak has none.

The Ekek can transform into a huge bird or bat at night to prowl. Similar to the Manananggal, the Ekek looks for sleeping pregnant women. Then it extends a very long proboscis into the womb and kills the fetus by draining its blood. It is said that while this is taking place, a "ek-ek-ek" sound is often heard.  The Ekek fools people into thinking it is far off in the distance by producing a faint sound when it is actually near.

References

Vampires
Visayan mythology
Philippine demons
Mythological anthropophages
Avian humanoids